This article details the squads that will participate in the Wichita Regional of the 2021 edition of The Basketball Tournament.

Squads

No. 1 Eberlein Drive

No. 2 AfterShocks

No. 3 Team Challenge ALS

No. 4 LA Cheaters

No. 5 Florida TNT

No. 6 Team Arkansas

No. 7 Purple & Black

No. 8 The Enchantment

No. 9 Stillwater Stars

No. 10 Omaha Blue Crew

No. 11 Fort Worth Funk

No. 12 Kimchi Express

No. 13 Mental Toughness

No. 14 We Are D3

No. 15 Ex-Pats

No. 16 NG Saints

References

The Basketball Tournament